Apistoloricaria laani is a species of armored catfish endemic to Colombia where it is found in the Meta River basin.  This species grows to a length of  SL.

Etymology
The catfish is named in honor of Louis André van der Laan, of the Zoölogisch Museum in Amsterdam.

References
 

Loricariini
Endemic fauna of Colombia
Freshwater fish of Colombia
Taxa named by Isaäc J. H. Isbrücker
Taxa named by Han Nijssen
Fish described in 1988